Bartholomew Dandridge (1691 – c. 1754) was an English portrait painter.

Life
According to Horace Walpole, Dandridge was the son of a house-painter. He studied at Sir Godfrey Kneller's academy of painting and later at the St Martin's Lane Academy. He had a career as a fashionable portrait painter in London for more than forty years, working in a style similar to that of John Vanderbank. In 1732,  he was commissioned by Lord Barington to paint a portrait of Frederick, Prince of Wales on horseback.

In 1733, he moved to 55, Great Queen Street, which had formed part of the house of Sir Godfrey Kneller until his death two years before.

He played a part in the development of the conversation piece, making groups of model figures to judge effects of light and shade.

His portraits of the historian Nathaniel Hooke and of Frederick, Prince of Wales are in the collection of the National Portrait Gallery, as is another painting by Dandridge, believed to be of William Kent. The collection of the Fitzwilliam Museum includes a Portrait of a Painter by Dandridge; this may be the self-portrait he is recorded as having painted in 1729,  although the identification of the subject is not certain.

References

1691 births
1750s deaths
18th-century English painters
English male painters
English portrait painters
Artists from London
Place of birth missing
Year of death uncertain
18th-century English male artists